Hennie Jacobs (born 20 June 1981) is a South African actor, musician, singer, comedian, and songwriter.

Early life 

Hennie Jacobs was born to Francois and Esther Jacobs on 20 June 1981 in Pretoria, the then Transvaal Province, now Gauteng Province of South Africa.

Jacobs was raised in Pretoria and is the youngest of three children (he has an older brother and sister). After matriculating from Hoërskool Waterkloof in Pretoria in 1999, he studied at the University of Pretoria towards a BComm (Hotel and Tourism Management) degree.
In 2001 he went on to study drama at Technikon Pretoria, now known as Tshwane University of Technology, where he was awarded a Baccalaureus Technologiae in Drama in 2003.

Personal life 

In November 2008 Jacobs and his then fiancée, Marissa Vosloo, fell victim to a carjacking at a petrol station at Paulshof in northern Johannesburg. The hijacker threatened the couple using a 9mm pistol and stole their vehicle. Nobody was injured.

On Saturday, 6 December 2008, Jacobs and Vosloo were married in an African setting in a Shebeen-themed wedding. Their first daughter, Nua Audrey Esthe Jacobs, was born on 22 January 2010. Their second daughter, Tali Anah Ella Jacobs, was born on 14 March 2013.

7de Laan 

Jacobs joined in the cast of 7de Laan as Diederik Greyling (Diedie) in November 2006. 7de Laan is an Afrikaans soap opera with some English and Zulu dialogue and English subtitles.

In collaboration with the SABC, in 2019 7de Laan developed a highly publicized storyline for Jacobs' character Diederik. Diederik survived a plane crash, where he was injured. He became addicted to drugs and contracted HIV. The real-life physician Dr Sindisiwe van Zyl portrayed herself and played Diederik's doctor. The 7de Laan HIV Awareness Campaign was launched because South Africa has a HIV epidemic, due to a lack of education and misguided beliefs about the disease.

Jacob's last on-air appearance on 7deLaan was on Thursday 23 April 2020, Jacob's character Diederik exits the show, when he decides to take over the farm from his dad who is becoming blind after years in the city in the fictional Hillside.

Acting career

Stage

Television

Filmography

Music videos

Television music performances

Albums

Studio albums

Compilation albums

References

External links
 7de Laan official website 
 
 

1981 births
Living people
Afrikaans-language singers
South African male stage actors
21st-century South African male singers
University of Pretoria alumni
People from Pretoria
Tshwane University of Technology alumni
South African male soap opera actors